The Sixth Military Region is a military region of Armed Forces of Yemen. Its headquarters is in Amran Governorate.

History 
The 6th region was established in 2013. On 10 April 2013 President Abdrabbuh Mansur Hadi issued a republication decree to restructure the military field into seven regions, including the 6th Military Region. The region is headquartered in Amran city and supervises the military units in Amran, Saada, and Al-Jawf Governorates.

Structure 
The region basically consists of 16 military units and formations, including; 310th Armored Brigade, 127 Infantry Brigade, 125 Infantry Brigade, 133 Infantry Brigade, 102 and 101 Infantry Brigades, and 117 Border Guard Brigade.

Leadership 

 Major General Mohammed Ali Al-Maqdashi (10 April 2013–12 July 2014)
 Major General Mohammed al-Hawri (12 July 2014– 2015)
 Major General Amin al-Waeli (2015– 2018)
 Major General Hashim al-Ahmar (2018– 2020)
 Major General Amin al-Waeli (2020– 27 March 2021)
 Major General Omar Sajaf (27 March 2021–22 December 2021)
 Major General Haikal Hantaf (2020– incumbent)

References 

Military regions of Yemen
Military of Yemen
Ministry of Defense (Yemen)
2013 establishments in Yemen